Datuk Wira Omar bin Jaafar is a Malaysian politician and former Speaker of the Malacca State Legislative Assembly.

Election results

Honours
  :
  Knight Commander of the Exalted Order of Malacca (DCSM) – Datuk Wira (2018)

References 

Living people
People from Malacca
Malaysian people of Malay descent
 People's Justice Party (Malaysia) politicians
21st-century Malaysian politicians
Year of birth missing (living people)
Speakers of the Malacca State Legislative Assembly